Amar Mullick (May 1899 – August 1972) was an Indian actor and director.

Career
Mullick was born in 1899 in Kolkata, British India. Although he was a civil engineer by profession but passionate in films. He joined New Theatres group in 1932 and worked with Premankur Atorthy. He acted in several Bengali and Hindi films usually playing side roles. Mullick created his own Amar Mullick Productions and became popular as director. He married actress Bharati Devi.

Partial filmography
 Chorekanta
 Dena Paona
 Sandigdha
 Punarjanma
 Chirakumar Sabha
 Kapalkundala
Devdas
 Abasheshe
Karodpati
 Grihadah
Mukti
 Sathi
 Sandhya
 Haar Jeet
 Sesh Raksha
 Biraj Bou
 Swami Vivekananda
 Samapti
 Durgeshnandini
 Chheley Kaar
 Shap Mochan
 Louha-Kapat
 Parash Pathar
 Chaowa Pawa
 Shashi Babur Sansar
 Mriter Martye Agaman
 Personal Assistant
 Prabesh Nishedh
 Kathin Maya
 Kancher Swarga
Shudhu Ekti Bachhar
 Uttar Purush

References

External links
 

1899 births
1972 deaths
Bengali film directors
19th-century Indian film directors
Film directors from Kolkata
Bengali people
Film directors from West Bengal
Male actors in Bengali cinema
Male actors in Hindi cinema